Mia's Science Adventure: Romaine's New Hat is the second title of the Mia's Big Adventure Collection software series created by Kutoka Interactive. Released in 2000 in Canada and the United States, the game teaches sciences to children between 6 and 10 years old.

Adventure
Mia lost her mother's hat to the rat Romaine. The player helps her on a quest to find it, buy it back and return home safely.

Activities
The game's 12 educational activities teach about plants and their parts; animals, their habitats, eating habits and classification; weather, clouds; the Solar System; earth science; the human body and its systems; heat energy; properties of matter fossils; electricity and magnetism.

Critical reception
Mia's Science Adventure received positive reviews from the Los Angeles Times, USA Today.com, eToys.com, Parent's Choice, National Parenting Center, Review Corner and others on account of the value of its educational contents, graphics, story and appeal to children.

Reception

The game received several awards such as the National Parenting Center's "Seal of Approval", the Coalition for Quality Children's Media's "Kids First Endorsement", Parents' Choice's "Gold Award".

Notes

External links
Mia's Science Adventure at Kutoka.com

2000 video games
Mia series
Classic Mac OS games
Video games developed in Canada
Windows games
Children's educational video games
Science educational video games
Video games about mice and rats